Tulla is a monotypic moth genus of the family Crambidae described by Elwood Zimmerman in 1958. Its only species, Tulla exonoma, described by Edward Meyrick in 1899, is endemic to the Hawaiian island of Oahu.

References

Crambinae
Endemic moths of Hawaii